Jonah Rzadzinski Matranga (born Jonah Sonz Matranga, August 11, 1969) is an American singer, songwriter and guitarist who has released a variety of solo material under his own name and onelinedrawing, and has previously been part of the bands Far and New End Original (an anagram of "onelinedrawing") and Gratitude. He now continues to work and tour under onelinedrawing'.

Biography

Early life
Jonah Rzadzinski Matranga grew up in Brookline, Massachusetts. He left in 1987 to attend Pitzer College in Claremont, California, where he majored in English and began making music by himself. After graduation, he moved to Sacramento to form Far in 1991.

They made four albums, including the classic Water and Solutions, before disbanding in December 1998. During this time, Jonah married in April 1994, and his daughter was born that August. He divorced two years later. In 1999, he moved to the Bay Area. He currently lives in San Francisco, making music and raising his daughter.

Solo career and New End Original
After the demise of Far, Jonah began to perform with a tape recorder and touring under the name onelinedrawing, which had been the name of a cassette he had released on Kevin Seconds's Pop Rockit Records. He released two EPs in 1999 (Sketchy EPs #1 and #2) of bedroom demos. He put out two further EPs in 2001 – "Always New JanJun00" and "Always New JulDec00".

In 2000, he formed and fronted New End Original, a band that primarily formed full-band versions of onelinedrawing songs. With the lineup completed by Texas Is The Reason alumni Scott Winegard (bass) and Norman Arenas (guitar), and drummer Charlie Walker (ex-Chamberlain), they released one album Thriller and a single for Lukewarm.

Much of his solo material has also been self-released, though often subsequently distributed through labels such as Crank! and Corrupted Image. However, his two full-length onelinedrawing albums, Visitor (2002) -a mixed bag of acoustic-based home recordings spanning a few years- and The Volunteers (2004) were released by Jade Tree Records.

The Volunteers possessed a more polished sound – courtesy of mixer Dave Sardy, who had previously worked with Matranga on Far's Water and Solutions.

Matranga retired the onelinedrawing moniker in 2004 and now intends to put all future solo releases under his name. In December 2004, Jonah began offering custom-made recordings of songs by himself or others through his website, in order to offer a one-of-a-kind musical artpiece. Information about this and his many other ideas can be found on Matranga's website, where he can also be contacted personally.

In 2005, Matranga put out Sketchy EP #3, as well as a DVD, There's a Lot in Here, both of which are available on a sliding scale ("pay what you can") from  Matranga's personally-maintained online store. The DVD There's a Lot in Here was re-released with a bonus CD on February 21, 2006, through Equal Vision Records.

Matranga's song "Crush on Everyone" was featured in the score to the 2008 John Humber film Dakota Skye and "Got My List" was sung by the movie's protagonists.

Guest appearances
Jonah has contributed backup vocals to War All the Time (by Thursday) on the track "Steps Ascending", and to the Deftones's acoustic remix version of "Be Quiet and Drive (Far Away)" and a cover of Sade's song "No Ordinary Love", both of which the Deftones released as b-sides (also, several Deftones members contributed to Far's cover of the Jawbox song "Savory").

He has also contributed to previous Matt Nathanson releases, a song called "Swamp" for tweaker (a.k.a. Chris Vrenna, former member of Nine Inch Nails), which ended up a b-side for the album The Attraction to All Things Uncertain, and to two Fort Minor songs for the album The Rising Tied: "Red to Black" with Kenna; and the single "Where'd You Go" with Holly Brook, where he also appears in the video. "Where'd You Go" managed to reach the #4 spot at the Billboard Hot 100.

Matranga's name does not appear on the title card before and after the video, though he is credited on the album. He attributed his video anonymity (jokingly) to his name being too long and "music biz yuck". He often expresses his negative opinion of the music industry's business ethics.

In 2005 he co-wrote "Calling" for Taproot, the first single from their album Blue-Sky Research. He also appeared on Food & Liquor, the debut album for Lupe Fiasco, on the track entitled "The Instrumental", which appeared on the Madden 07 soundtrack. Jonah sings a hook ("And he never lied, 'cause he never said anything at all") directly taken from the lyrics from "Nestle", a song from the Far album Water & Solutions. The track was produced by Mike Shinoda of Linkin Park and Fort Minor.

Jonah has also lent his vocals on Atlanta-based band [minus]'s (later changed to [minus driver]) song "Hesitant and Polite" which appeared on their album Structure of Simplicity.

Jonah returned to the onelinedrawing name in 2012 for Audio Antihero label's "Some.Alternate.Universe" compilation for the FSID charity. He contributed "Friendship Tango".

Jonah sung backing vocals for Zebulon-Raleigh, North Carolina based songwriter Nick Driver's independent release Poets' Corner Volume One track titled "Universal Love" in late 2012.

In August 2021, UK stoner/post-rock band Sons of Alpha Centauri released their latest album Push featuring Jonah as guest vocalist on all nine tracks. This was a notable departure from the band's formerly instrumental sound.

Discography

Solo releases
 Jonah Sonz Matranga – Songs I Hope My Mom Will Like (1994)
 Jonah Matranga – Jonah's One-line Drawing (1998 Poprockit)
 Jonah's Onelinedrawing – Sketchy EP #1 (1999)
 Jonah's Onelinedrawing – Sketchy EP #2 (2000)
 onelinedrawing/Sense Field – Split EP (2000)
 onelinedrawing/Rival Schools – Rival Schools United by Onelinedrawing (2001)
 onelinedrawing – Always New Jan-Jun 2000 (online 2000, CD 2001)
 onelinedrawing – Always New Jul-Dec 2000 (online 2000, CD 2002)
 onelinedrawing – Always New 2001 (online 2001 only)
 onelinedrawing – Visitor (2002 Jade Tree)
 onelinedrawing – The Volunteers (2004 Jade Tree)
 Jonah Matranga – There's a Lot in Here (2005 Ewusl Vision)
 Jonah Matranga – Sketchy EP #3 (2005)
 Jonah Matranga / Frank Turner Split – Split 12 inch vinyl (2006)
 Jonah Matranga – The Three Sketchys (2006)
 Jonah Matranga – And (2007 Limekiln Records (USA)). (Also released on Blacktop in Canada, Arctic Rodeo in Germany, Daymare in Japan, Xtra Mile in UK and Yr Letter Records in France.)
 Jonah Matranga – And Furthermore (And B-Sides & Acoustic Versions)
 Jonah Matranga – Fort Teen (2009) 100 hand numbered, hand made cd of home recordings between 1984–87
 Jonah Matranga / Kevin Seconds – split 7 inch vinyl (December 2009) (Blacktop – Canada)
 Jonah Matranga – You're 16, You're 23, You're 32 (DIY boxset) (2009)
 Jonah Matranga – You're All Those Things And Then You're None (2010)
 Jonah's Onelinedrawing – Me and You are Two (2014)
 Jonah Matranga / Mikee J Reds Countrysides EP, "Sweet Life" "Secret World"
 Onelinedrawing - Tenderwild (2022)

The Three Sketchys
The Three Sketchys (1999-2005) is an anthology containing the contents of three albums:

Sketchy EP #1 by Onelinedrawing (1999)
Sketchy EP #2 by Onelinedrawing (2000)
Sketchy EP #3 by Jonah Matranga (2005)

along with a bonus track: a new mix of "The Big Parade" from Sketchy EP #2. The recordings span 1999–2005 and are described by the artist as a collection of "homemade" tracks spanning several years. It was released in 2006 by OLD Records, a self-managed label by Jonah Matranga.

Band releases
Far – Sweat a River, Live No Lies (1991 Enharmonik Studios)
Far – Listening Game (1992 Rusty Nail Records)
Far – Quick (1994 Our Own Records)
Far – Tin Cans With Strings To You (1996 Epic/Immortal)
Far – Soon EP (1997 Epic/Immortal)
Far – Water & Solutions (1998 Epic/Immortal)
Far – At Night We Live (2010 Vagrant)
Far – Pony 7" on Bright Antenna (December 2009)
New End Original – Lukewarm single (2001 Jade Tree)
New End Original – Thriller (2001 Jade Tree)
Gratitude – Gratitude (2005 Atlantic)
Gratitude – Drive Away single (2005 Atlantic)
Gratitude – This Is the Part EP (written as This Is th EP Art) (2005)
I Is Another – I Is Another (2013 Arctic Rodeo Recordings)
Camorra – Mourning, Resistance, Celebration (2017 Arctic Rodeo Recordings)
Sons of Alpha Centauri - Push (2021 Exile on Mainstream Records)

iTunes Releases
 I Believe Barack Obama 2009
 I Still Miss Someone (J.Cash Cover) 2009
 What Beyonce Said To Jay-Z Before She Left Him For Me (Irreplaceable Cover) 2009
 Live in Rotterdam December 15, 2007 (15 song set with new, old and cover songs) 2009
 Live at Hotel Cafe, LA, CA May 6, 2009 (various songs and various covers) 2009
 Live in Rotterdam DIY Download 2009-07-14 (17 song set with Iamani)
 Live in Amsterdam DIY Download 15/07/09 (14 song set)
 Live in Leuven DIY Download 2/03/09 (17 song set)
 Random Covers, Vol.1 DIY Download (11 homemade recordings of various covers) 2009

Books
 Jonah Matranga – Alone Rewinding: 23 Years of Fatherhood and Music (2017)

 Television Appearances 
 The Classroom Series - Season 1: Episode 1 "Alone Rewinding with Jonah Matranga" (October 16, 2017) first aired November 6, 2017''

References

External links
 A 2012 Interview With Jonah on Shattered Glass Media
 Jonah's Website
 A 2009 interview with Jonah Matranga
 Jonah Matranga interview on Rockmidgets.com
jonahmatranga.com: The Three Sketchys (1999-2005)
jonahmatranga.com: Yard Sale

1969 births
American male singer-songwriters
American rock singers
American rock songwriters
Equal Vision Records artists
Jade Tree (record label) artists
Living people
People from Brookline, Massachusetts
People from the San Francisco Bay Area
Pitzer College alumni
Singer-songwriters from Massachusetts